Business in the Community (BITC) is a British business-community outreach charity promoting responsible business, CSR, corporate responsibility, and is one of the Prince's Charities of King Charles III (formerly the Prince of Wales).

BITC works with companies in the UK and internationally, who are committed to improving their impact on society.   BITC seeks to positively shape business impact on the environment, in the marketplace, in the workplace and in the community. It is an organisation that works with businesses to improve their corporate social responsibility (CSR) credentials, offering advice and programmes tailored to meet their needs.

Background
BITC was set up in 1982 and its current CEO is Amanda Mackenzie OBE, who joined the organisation in 2016. Prior to this, Dame Julia Cleverdon was CEO from 1992 to 2008 and is now vice president, and Stephen Howard was CEO from 2008 to 2016.

Each of BITC's campaigns is managed by a leadership team, made up and chaired by senior business leaders. Leaders include Steven Holliday, chief executive of National Grid plc; Mark Allen, chief executive of Dairy Crest Group; Paul Drechsler, chairman and chief executive of Wates Group; Richard Howson, chief executive of Carillion, and Ian Cheshire, CEO of Kingfisher plc.

Business in the Community is one of The Prince's Charities, a group of not-for-profit organisations of which Charles III is president. Seventeen of the nineteen charities were founded personally by The Prince.

Related activities

The Responsible Business Awards
Business in the Community launched the Awards for Excellence at its AGM in December 1997. They are presented annually to businesses that are judged to show innovation, creativity and a sustained commitment to corporate responsibility.

The Prince's Seeing is Believing (SIB)
The Prince's Seeing is Believing programme was started by the Prince of Wales in 1990, by inviting businesspeople to go on visits around the county. Some 8,000 chief executives have led visits tackling subjects such as urban homelessness and illiteracy to challenges facing hill farmers in remote areas.

Opportunity Now
Founded in October 1991, and supported by the then Prime Minister John Major MP, Opportunity Now is a UK membership organisation working towards gender equality and diversity in the workplace.

The campaign's chair Helena Morrissey, CEO of Newton Investment Management and founder of the 30% Club, was appointed in 2013.

BBC Documentary Series 
John Walsh made the 2003 BBC documentary series Headhunting The Homeless following the work of Eva Hamilton's Business Action on Homelessness project as part of Business in the Community.

References

External links 
 Business in the Community

 The Prince's Charities
 Opportunity Now

Charities based in London
1982 establishments in the United Kingdom
Organizations established in 1982
The Prince's Charities
Social responsibility organizations